The 2021 African & Oceania Wrestling Olympic Qualification Tournament was the third regional qualifying tournament for the 2020 Summer Olympics. The event was held from 2 to 4 April 2021, in Hammamet, Tunisia.

Qualification summary 
A total of 36 athletes secured a spot in the 2020 Summer Olympics, in Tokyo, Japan. Two spots were given to each of the weight classes in every event. This allows a total of 12 available spots for each event. Every winner and runner-up per class were awarded their place for wrestling, at the 2020 Summer Olympics. Quota places are allocated to the respective NOC and not to competitor that achieved the place in the qualification event.

Men's freestyle

57 kg
4 April

65 kg
4 April

74 kg
4 April

86 kg
4 April

97 kg
4 April

125 kg
4 April

Men's Greco-Roman

60 kg
2 April

67 kg
2 April

77 kg
2 April

87 kg
2 April

97 kg
2 April

130 kg
2 April

Women's freestyle

50 kg
3 April

53 kg
3 April

57 kg
3 April

62 kg
3 April

68 kg
3 April

76 kg
3 April

See also 
2020 Pan American Wrestling Olympic Qualification Tournament
2021 European Wrestling Olympic Qualification Tournament
2021 Asian Wrestling Olympic Qualification Tournament
2021 World Wrestling Olympic Qualification Tournament

References

External links
United World Wrestling

Qualification America
Olympic Q Africa
Africa and Oceania Wrestling Olympic Qualification Tournament
Africa and Oceania Wrestling Olympic Qualification Tournament